Lucas Mensa (born 24 May 1996) is an Argentine rugby union centre. He made his debut for the  international team on 17 August 2019 against  in Pretoria, South Africa.

On 19 August 2019 Mensa was named in Argentina's squad for the 2019 Rugby World Cup. He is the only amateur player of the squad.

References

1996 births
Living people
Rugby union centres
Argentine rugby union players
Argentina international rugby union players
Jaguares (Super Rugby) players
Dogos XV players